Liberdade [libeɾˈdadʒi], (Portuguese for "Liberty", "Freedom") may refer to:

Geography
Liberdade (district of São Paulo)
Liberdade (São Paulo Metro)
Liberdade street market
Liberdade (neighbourhood), in Salvador, Bahia, Brazil
Liberdade, Minas Gerais, a municipality in the state of Minas Gerais in the Southeast region of Brazil
Praça da Liberdade (Liberty Square), a principal square in the city of Belo Horizonte, Brazil
Praça da Liberdade (Porto) Liberdade Square (Porto), a square in the city of Porto, Portugal
Avenida da Liberdade (Lisbon) (Liberty Avenue), an important avenue in central Lisbon, in Portugal
Liberdade River (Juruá River), a river of Acre and Amazonas states in western Brazil
Liberdade River (Xingu River), a river in Brazil
Palácio da Liberdade a building in Belo Horizonte, Brazil

Transport
Liberdade class underwater glider, autonomous underwater gliders developed by the US Navy Office of Naval Research

Music
Liberdade, a 1986 album by Nana Mouskouri
Sol da Liberdade (Portuguese for Sun of freedom), an album by Daniela Mercury
"Cântico da Liberdade" (in English: Song of Freedom), the national anthem of Cape Verde

See also
Order of Liberty (Portuguese: Ordem da Liberdade) is a Portuguese honorific civil order
Liberty Institute (Brazil) (redirect from Instituto Liberdade)  Brazilian independent think tank
The Bowels of Liberty (redirect from Os Subterraneos da Liberdade)  a trilogy of Brazilian Modernist novels written by Jorge Amado in 1954.
Liberdade, Socialismo e Revolucao  a Trotskyist political organisation in Brazil, created in 2009
Partido Socialismo e Liberdade Brazilian political party  PSOL